is a Japanese professional golfer.

Yokoyama played on the Japan Golf Tour, winning three times.  He is sponsored by ISPS.

Professional wins (4)

Japan Golf Tour wins (3)

*Note: The 1989 Pepsi Ube Kosan Open was shortened to 54 holes due to rain.

Japan Golf Tour playoff record (1–1)

Other wins (1)
1997 Kanto Open

External links

Japanese male golfers
Japan Golf Tour golfers
Sportspeople from Tokyo
1961 births
Living people